Sir Graham Ken Panckhurst  (born 1945) is a retired New Zealand High Court judge. He chaired the Royal Commission into the Pike River Mine disaster.

Early life and family
Born in Reefton in 1945, Panckhurst was educated at Reefton District High School and Christchurch Boys' High School. He went on to study law at the University of Canterbury, and was elected to the university's Student Representative Council. He married his wife, Jill, a registered nurse, in the late 1960s.

Legal career
Panckhurst was admitted as a barrister and solicitor in Christchurch on 20 February 1970. In 1985, he was appointed as Crown Solicitor for Canterbury and the West Coast. Panckhurst took silk in 1994 and was appointed to the High Court bench in 1996. He retired from the High Court bench in 2014.

Notable work
In 2009, Panckhurst heard the retrial of David Bain.  The trial was substantial with the prosecution calling 150 witnesses. In 2010, Panckhurst was appointed to head the Royal Commission into the Pike River Mine disaster.

Honours
In November 2014, Panckhurst was granted the retention of the title The Honourable, in recognition of his service as a High Court judge. In the 2015 New Year Honours, he was appointed a Knight Companion of the New Zealand Order of Merit, for services to the judiciary.

See also
Pike River Mine disaster
High Court of New Zealand

References

1945 births
Living people
People from Reefton
People educated at Christchurch Boys' High School
University of Canterbury alumni
20th-century New Zealand judges
High Court of New Zealand judges
New Zealand King's Counsel
Knights Companion of the New Zealand Order of Merit
21st-century New Zealand judges